Ratko Svilar (Serbian Cyrillic: Ратко Свилар; born 6 May 1950) is a Serbian retired footballer who played as a goalkeeper.

Having played for Antwerp for nearly 20 years, he also coached the Belgian club on several occasions.

Club career
Born in Crvenka, Socialist Federal Republic of Yugoslavia, Svilar joined Royal Antwerp F.C. in November 1980 from FK Vojvodina – he started his career with lowly hometown club FK Crvenka – and proceeded to endure a 16-year spell with the Belgian side, alternating between the posts and the bench; in the 1991–92 season, he contributed with 12 league appearances to help his team finish in fifth position, winning the Belgian Cup – his only piece of silverware – in the process.

Svilar retired from professional play aged 46, going on to have several coaching spells with his last and most important club.

International career
Svilar represented Yugoslavia for seven years, and was a participant at the 1982 FIFA World Cup. He won his first cap on 25 September 1976, starting in a 0–3 away friendly loss to Italy.

Personal life
Svilar's son, Mile, is also a goalkeeper.

See also
List of association football families

References

External links
Royal Antwerp profile 

NASL Jerseys profile

1950 births
Living people
Yugoslav footballers
Serbian footballers
Association football goalkeepers
Yugoslav First League players
FK Vojvodina players
North American Soccer League (1968–1984) players
Rochester Lancers (1967–1980) players
Belgian Pro League players
Royal Antwerp F.C. players
Yugoslavia international footballers
1982 FIFA World Cup players
Yugoslav expatriate footballers
Serbian expatriate footballers
Expatriate soccer players in the United States
Expatriate footballers in Belgium
Yugoslav expatriates in Belgium
Serbian expatriate sportspeople in Belgium
Serbian football managers
Royal Antwerp F.C. managers
Serbian expatriate football managers
Expatriate football managers in Belgium
FK Crvenka players